Sanditon is a British historical drama television series adapted by Andrew Davies from an unfinished manuscript by Jane Austen and starring Rose Williams, Theo James, and Ben Lloyd-Hughes. Set during the Regency era, the plot follows a young and naive heroine as she navigates the new seaside resort of Sanditon.

Due to the unfinished nature of the novel (Austen completed only eleven chapters), the original work was used for the majority of the first episode, and then Davies used the developed characters to complete the story. The novel is set in a seaside town during a time of social change. At the time of her death in 1817, Austen had completed 24,000 words of the novel.

The series first aired on ITV in the United Kingdom on 25 August 2019 in eight parts, and in the United States on 12 January 2020 on PBS, which supported the production as part of its Masterpiece anthology. A second and third series were commissioned in May 2021, as part of a collaboration between PBS and BritBox, with ITV acquiring the series for later linear broadcast (i.e., broadcast programming; compare, OTT).

Overview
A chance accident brings Charlotte Heywood to Sanditon, a seaside resort on the cusp of dramatic change. Spirited and unconventional, Charlotte is initially keen to experience everything the town has to offer but is then shocked by its scheming and ambitious inhabitants and intrigued by the secrets they share. When Charlotte is tactlessly forthright about the family of enthusiastic entrepreneur Tom Parker, she immediately clashes with his handsome but wild younger brother Sidney. Amidst the rival suitors and unexpected danger, can Charlotte and Sidney see past each other's flaws and find love?

Cast

Main

 Rose Williams as Charlotte Heywood 
 Kate Ashfield as Mary Parker 
 Crystal Clarke as Georgiana Lambe 
 Turlough Convery as Arthur Parker
 Jack Fox as Sir Edward Denham
 Kris Marshall as Tom Parker
 Anne Reid as Lady Denham
 Lily Sacofsky as Clara Brereton
 Charlotte Spencer as Esther, Lady Babington (née Denham)

Series 1
 Theo James as Sidney Parker
 Alexandra Roach as Diana Parker
 Matthew Needham as Mr. Crowe
 Mark Stanley as Lord Babington
 Leo Suter as James Stringer

Series 2
 Maxim Ays as Captain William Carter
 Frank Blake as Captain Declan Fraser 
 Rosie Graham as Alison Heywood 
 Ben Lloyd-Hughes as Alexander Colbourne 
 Alexander Vlahos as Charles Lockhart 
 Tom Weston-Jones as Colonel Francis Lennox

Recurring cast

 Kevin Eldon as Mr. Hankins 
 Adrian Scarborough as Dr. Fuchs 
 James Atherton as Fred Robinson
 Jack Brady as Mr. Howard
 Isobel Hawkridge, Molly Bishop, Isaac Vincent-Norgate as the Parker children: Alicia, Jenny and Henry

Series 1
 Elizabeth Berrington as Mrs. Griffiths
 Mollie Holder as Phillida Beaufort 
 Rob Jarvis as Isaac Stringer 
 Jyuddah Jaymes as Otis Molyneux 
 Ruth Kearney as Eliza Campion 
 Kayleigh-Paige Rees as Julia Beaufort
 Sophie Winkleman as Susan, Lady Worcester

Series 2
 Sandy McDade as Miss Beatrice Hankins 
 Flora Mitchell as Leonora “Leo” Colbourne 
 Eloise Webb as Augusta Markham 
 Flo Wilson as Mrs. Wheatley

Guest cast

 Sarah Belcher as Mrs. Heywood
 Clinton Blake as Sam Sidaway
 Liz May Brice as Mrs. Harries
 Jon Foster as Beecroft
 Adrian Rawlins as Mr. Heywood
 Tessa Stephens as Young Alison Heywood

Episodes

Series overview

Series 1 (2019)

Series 2 (2022)
Series (Season) 2 and 3 were commissioned by the U.S. Public Broadcasting Service (PBS) for its Masterpiece anthology series. Season 2 premiered on 20 March 2022 in the US and Series 2 will air on 22 July 2022 in the UK.

Series 3

Production
Many of the Sanditon scenes were filmed in Somerset, including the seaside towns of Clevedon, Brean and Weston-super-Mare. Dyrham Park near Bath, Somerset was the location for Sanditon House. The bridge at Iford Manor was used in the first episode. Most of the interior filming was on interior and exterior sets built at The Bottle Yard Studios in Bristol.

Before the first series premiered in the United States, ITV cancelled it in December 2019. With the help of Masterpiece (PBS) and fans of the show, Sanditon was able to fundraise enough money to continue the series. Series two was announced to be released on 20 March 2022, followed by a third series. Three main actors from season one, Theo James, Mark Stanley, and Leo Suter had all moved on to new projects and did not return for season two.

With Theo James’ (Sidney Parker) departure from the series, new cast members were announced, with Rose Williams reprising her role as Charlotte Heywood. Season 2 began filming in July 2021. Season 2 premiered on PBS on March 20, 2022 and Series 2 aired on ITV on 22 July 2022.

Critical reception
Critical reception has been mixed. Some UK media outlets reported that viewers were shocked at the depictions of sex and nudity in the opening episode, considering it to be untrue to the works of Jane Austen. Many viewers critiqued the ending as unusual and very "un-Austen-like". Viewers claimed Austen would have liked a happy ending for all the characters, as she has happy endings in all of her stories; however, this could have been a set up for a second season.

References

External links
  on Masterpiece (TV series)
 
 

2019 British television series debuts
2010s British drama television series
2020s British drama television series
ITV television dramas
BritBox original programming
Period television series
English-language television shows
Television shows set in Somerset
Television shows based on works by Jane Austen